This page provides supplementary chemical data on Ytterbium(III) chloride

Structure and properties data

Thermodynamic properties

Spectral data

References
Chemical data pages
Chemical data pages cleanup